Rincón is a corregimiento in Gualaca District, Chiriquí Province, Panama. Its population as of 1990 was 1,200; its population as of 2000 was 1,364.

References

Corregimientos of Chiriquí Province